Andriy Anatoliyovych Rusol (born 16 January 1983) is a Ukrainian retired footballer who formerly played as a defender for Dnipro Dnipropetrovsk and the Ukraine national team.

Club career
Rusol was a defender. He started his career with Zirka Kirovohrad in the 1998–99 season. He then transferred to Kryvbas Kryvyi Rih for the 1999–2000 season. He played for Kryvbas until 2003, when he was transferred to Dnipro Dnipropetrovsk. He played 117 matches for Dnipro and scored 5 goals. In the 2007–08 season, Rusol became the captain of Dnipro. He retired on 24 August 2011 due to back injuries, aged 28.

International career
Rusol made his debut for Ukraine on 31 March 2004. Since then, he has played 49 matches and scored 3 goals.

Rusol scored Ukraine's first World Cup finals goal in the 4th minute against Saudi Arabia in the 2006 World Cup. Recently, he was the captain against Sweden and beat them 1–0.

Personal life
Rusol's hobbies are jazz music and reading.

External links
FIFA World Cup 2006 Profile
 Profile on website Football Ukraine

References

Association football defenders
Ukrainian footballers
2006 FIFA World Cup players
Ukraine international footballers
Ukraine under-21 international footballers
Living people
Sportspeople from Kropyvnytskyi
FC Dnipro players
FC Kryvbas Kryvyi Rih players
FC Zirka Kropyvnytskyi players
Ukrainian Premier League players
1983 births